The Irish League in season 1919–20 comprised eight teams. An all Ireland league championship resumed after a four-year suspension due to the First World War; during the war teams had competed locally in the Belfast & District League or the Leinster Senior League.  Belfast Celtic won the championship. Due to the political upheaval resulting from the Irish War of Independence, Belfast Celtic, Shelbourne and Bohemians all withdrew from the league with the conclusion of this season. Shelbourne and Bohemians later joined the new League of Ireland while Belfast Celtic would return to the Irish League in 1924-25.

League standings

Results

References
Northern Ireland - List of final tables (RSSSF)

NIFL Premiership seasons
Ireland
Irish
1920 in Irish sport